Southwest Sumba Regency is a regency on Sumba Island in East Nusa Tenggara province of Indonesia. Established in 2007, the regency has its seat (capital) in Tambolaka.  Its population was 283,818 in the 2010 decennial census and had risen to 303,650 at the 2020 census, comprising 155,716 male and 147,934 female.

Administrative districts 

The Southwest Sumba Regency (created in 2007 out of parts of West Sumba Regency) as at the 2010 census was composed of eight districts (kecamatan), but since 2010, three additional districts have been created within the Regency, by the splitting of existing districts.
The areas (in km2) and the populations of the districts at the 2010 census and the 2020 census are listed below. The table also includes the locations of the district administrative centres, and the number of villages (rural desa and urban kelurahan) in each district.

Notes: (a) The 2010 census populations of Kodi Balaghar is included with the figures for Kodi Bangedo, from which it was split.(b) The 2010 census populations of Kota Tambolaka and Wewewa Tengah Districts are included with the figures for the districts from which they were split.

Tourism 

There are a variety of attractions in Southwest Sumba that are still preserved and have their own uniqueness for tourists visiting the location of these attractions are located.

Most areas of Southwest Sumba Regency have potential tourism objects that can be promoted as tourist destinations due to their unique natural, cultural and marine elements. The surrounding natural conditions also support panorama of each tourist attraction because it is still a vast expanse of hills, rivers and lakes, tropical forests, and various wild flora and fauna styles.

Several tourist attractions in this district have been widely explored and visited by a variety of local and foreign tourists, but there are only a few who have access to roads and adequate facilities and infrastructure available, namely Mananga Aba Beach, Mbawana beach, Oro Beach, Kawona Beach, Newa Beach, Pantai Waikelo, Sumba Cultural Home, Lake Saltwater Weekuri, and Pabeti Waterfall.

At present, its existence is a tourist attraction in Southwest Sumba Regency, many of which have begun to be exposed to other tourists through tourists who have visited several tourist attraction locations in this district.

References 

Regencies of East Nusa Tenggara
Sumba